Nirjhar is a surname and given name. Notable people with the name include: 

Enamul Karim Nirjhar (born 1962), Bangladeshi architect and filmmaker
Nirjhar Pratapgarhi, Indian poet